Kalloni is a village and a community of the Grevena municipality. Before the 2011 local government reform it was a part of the municipality of Kosmas o Aitolos, of which it was a municipal district. The 2011 census recorded 25 residents in the village. The community of Kalloni covers an area of 9.447 km2.

History
The settlement was established in 1690 and was officially listed in the archives of the Monastery of Zavorda in 1797. The village was liberated in the Balkan wars in 1912 and renamed to Kalloni in 1926. Its former name was Lountzi.

See also
 List of settlements in the Grevena regional unit

References

Populated places in Grevena (regional unit)